The following is a list of Sunni Muslim  dynasties.

Asia

Arabian Peninsula 
Ziyadid dynasty (819–1018)
Banu Wajih (926–965)
Sharif of Mecca (967–1925)
Al Uyuniyun (1076–1253)
Sulaymanids (1063–1174)
Mahdids (1159–1174)
Kathiri (Hadhramaut) (1395–1967)
Al-Jabriyun (1417–1521)
Banu Khalid (1669–1796)
Al Qasimi (Ras al Khaymah) (1727–present)
House of Saud (Saudi Arabia) (1744–present)
House of Al-Sabah (Kuwait) (1752–present)
Al Nahyan family (Abu Dhabi) (1761–present)
Al Qasimi (Sharjah) (18th century–present)
Al Mualla (Umm al-Quwain) (1775–present)
Al Khalifa family (Bahrain) (1783–present)
Mahra Sultanate (18th century–1967)
Al Nuaimi (Ajman) (1816–present)
House of Thani (Qatar) (1825–present)
Al Maktoum (Dubai) (1833–present)
Al Rashid (1836–1921)
Al Sharqi (Fujairah) (1876–present)
Qu'aiti (1902–1967)
Emirate of Beihan (1903–1967)
Lower Yafa (19th century–1967)
Upper Yafa (19th century–1967)

Iran and Caucasus

 Sadakiyans (770–828) 58 Years
Dulafid dynasty (early 9th century–897)
Samanid dynasty (819–999) 180 Years
Tahirid dynasty (821–873) 16 Years
Saffarid dynasty (861–1003) 142 Years
Sajids (889–929) 40 Years
Farighunid (late 9th–early 11th centuries)
Ma'danids (late 9th–11th centuries)
Sallarid (942–979) 37 Years
Shaddadid dynasty (951–1199) 248 Years
Rawadid dynasty (955–1116) 161 Years
Annazid dynasty (990–1116) 126 Years
Hadhabani (906–1063) 157 Years
Seljuq dynasty (11th–14th centuries)
Hazaraspids (1115–1425) 310 Years
Khorshidi dynasty (1155–1597) 442 Years
Ardalan (1187–1868) 681 Years
Mihrabanids (1236–1537) 301 Years
Muzaffarids (1335–1393) 58 Years
Afsharid dynasty (1736–1804) 68 Years
Shirvan Khanate (1748–1820 AD) 72 Years
Zand dynasty (1750–1794) 44 years
Savakhvakho dynasty (3.8.1563—26.8.1844) 281 Years
Shaki Khanate (1743–1819 AD) 76 Years
Maku Khanate (1747–1922 AD) 175 Years

Central Asia
Kara-Khanid Khanate (840–1212) 372 Years
Al Muhtaj (10th–early 11th centuries)
Ghaznavids (977–1187) 210 Years 
Khwārazm-Shāh dynasty (1077–1231) 154 Years 
Ghurids (879–1215) 336 Years
Gabare Jahangiri dynasty (1190–1520) 330 Years
Kartids (1231–1389)
Timurid Empire (1370–1507) of the Timurid dynasty
Kazakh Khanate (1456–1847)
Khanate of Bukhara (1500–1785)
Khanate of Khiva (1511–1920)
Khanate of Kokand (1709–1876)
Hotaki dynasty (1709–1738)
Durrani Empire (1747–1826)
Barakzai dynasty (1826–1973)
White Horde (1360–1428)
Emirate of Bukhara (1785–1920)
Shah Mir dynasty

East Asia (China)
Moghulistan (1347–1680)
Yarkent Khanate (1514–1705)
Kumul Khanate (1696–1930)

Asia Minor (Modern Turkey) 
Marwanids (983–1100)
Mengujekids (1071–1277)
Sultanate of Rum (1077–1307)
Shah-Armens (1100–1207)
Chobanids (1227–1309)
Hisn Kayfa (1249–1524)
Karamanids (c. 1250–1487)
Pervâneoğlu (1261–1322)
Menteşe (c. 1261–1424)
Ahis (c. 1380–1362)
Hamidids (c. 1280–1374)
Germiyanids (1299–1428)
Ottoman dynasty (1299–1923)
Ladik (c. 1300–1368)
Isfendiyarids (Jandarids, c. 1300–1461)
Teke (1301–1423)
Sarukhanids (1302–1410)
Karasids (1303–1360)
Aydinids (1307–1425)
Ramadanids (1352–1516)

Levant region
Artuqids (11th–12th century)
Burid dynasty (1104–1154)
Zengid dynasty (1127–1250)
Baban (1649–1850)
Hashemite dynasty of Iraq (1921–1958)
Hashemite dynasty of Jordan (1921–present)
Mamluk dynasty (1704–1831)

South Asia (India, Pakistan, Afghanistan, Maldives & Bangladesh)
House of Theemuge (Maldives) (1166–1388)
Khalji dynasty of Bengal (1204–1231)
Mamluk Sultanate (Delhi) (1206–1290)
Khalji dynasty of Delhi (1290–1321)
Tughlaq dynasty (1321–1414)
Samma dynasty (1335–1520)
Ilyas Shahi dynasty (1342–1487)
Katoor dynasty (1560–1969)
Shah Mir dynasty (1339–1561)
Faruqi dynasty (1382–1601)
Hilaalee dynasty (Maldives) (1388–1558)
Muzaffarids (1391–1583)
Malwa Sultanate (1401–1561)
Ganesha dynasty (1414–1436)
Sayyid dynasty (1414–1451)
Malerkotla State State of Sherwanis (1446–1947)
Lodi dynasty or Lodhi dynasty (1451–1526)
Adil Shahi dynasty of Bijapur – Deccan (1490–1686)
Arghun dynasty (late 15th–16th centuries)
Hussain Shahi dynasty (1494–1538)
Mughal dynasty (1526–1857)
Suri dynasty (1540–1556)
Arakkal kingdom (1545–18th century)
Karrani dynasty (1564–1576)
Utheemu dynasty (Maldives) (1632–1692)
Khan of Kalat (1666–1958)
Nawab of the Carnatic (1690–1801)
Isdhoo dynasty (Maldives) (1692–1704)
Dhiyamigili dynasty Maldives) (1704–1759)
Nawab of Bhopal (1723–1947)
Asaf Jah dynasty, Nizam of Hyderabad (1724–1948)
Babi dynasty (1735–1947)
Mysore Kingdom (1749–1799)
Huraa dynasty (Maldives) (1759–1968)
Tonk (princely state) (1798–1947)
Baoni Nawabs (1784–1948)
Sidi dynasty of Janjira and Jafrabad (1759–1948)
Orakzai dynasty of Kurwai, Basoda and Mohammadgarh (1713–1948)
Miyana dynasty of Savanur (1672–1948)
Durrani Empire (1747–1842)

South-East Asia

Samudera Pasai Sultanate (1267–1521)
Malacca Sultanate (1400–1511)
Bruneian Sultanate (1363–present) 
Aceh Sultanate (1496–1904)
Sultanate of Siak Sri Indrapura (1723–1949)
Aru Kingdom (1225–1613)
Sultanate of Langkat (1568–1946)
Sultanate of Asahan (1630–1946)
Sultanate of Serdang (1723–1946)
Sultanate of Deli (1632–1946)
Pagaruyung Kingdom (1347–1833)
Sultanate of Johor (1528–present)
Sultanate of Kedah (1136–present)
Sultanate of Kelantan (1267–present)
Sultanate of Perak (1528–present)
Sultanate of Pahang (1470–present)
Sultanate of Selangor (1743–present)
Sultanate of Terengganu (1725–present)
Perlis Kingdom (1843–present)
Negeri Sembilan Kingdom (1773–present)
Sultanate of Sarawak (1599–1641)
Bima Sultanate (1620–1958)
Mataram Sultanate (1586–1755)
Demak Sultanate (1475–1554)
Cirebon Sultanate (1430–1666)
Banten Sultanate (1527–1813)
Kingdom of Pajang (1568–1618)
Yogyakarta Sultanate (1755–present)
Surakarta Sunanate (1755–1945)
Kingdom of Sumedang Larang (1527–1620)
Kalinyamat Sultanate (1527–1599)
Sultanate of Ternate (1257–1914)
Sultanate of Tidore (1450–1967)
Sultanate of Jailolo (1200s–1832)
Sultanate of Bacan (1322–1965)
Sultanate of Banjar (1526–1860)
Sultanate of Pontianak (1771–1950)
Sultanate of Sambas (1609–1956)
Sultanate of Sintang (1365–1950)
Sultanate of Bulungan (1731–1964)
Kutai Kartanegara Sultanate (1600s–1945) 
Kingdom of Bolaang Mongondow (1670–1950)
Sultanate of Gowa (1300s–1945)
Kingdom of Tallo (1400–1856)
Palembang Sultanate (1659–1823)
Kingdom of Kaimana (1309–1923) 
Jambi Sultanate (1550–1905)
Riau-Lingga Sultanate (1824–1911)
Kingdom of Manila (1258–1571)
Sultanate of Maguindanao (1515–1905)
Sultanate of Sulu (1405–1915, 1962–1986)
Pattani Kingdom (1457–1902)
Sultanate of Singora (1605–1680)
Kingdom of Setul Mambang Segara (1808–1916)
Kingdom of Reman (1810–1902)
Kingdom of Champa (1485–1832)
Kingdom of Arakan (1429–1879)

Africa

North Africa
Salihid dynasty (710–1019)
Banu thabit (1327-1406
Banu Khattab (918-1172)
Banu Khazrun (1001-1146)
Khormans (1300-1551)
Awlad Muhammad (1551-1812]]
Ifranid dynasty (742–1066)
Rustamid dynasty (777–909)
Muhallabids (771–793)
Idrisid dynasty (788–974)
Aghlabids (800–909)
Sulaymanid dynasty (814–922)
Tulunids (868–905)
Ikhsisids (935–969)
Zirids (973–1148)
Hammadids (1008–1152)
Almoravids ( 1040–1147)
Almohads (1147–1269)
Ayyubids (1171–1341)
Hafsid dynasty (1229–1574)
Nasrid dynasty (1232–1492)
Ziyyanid dynasty (1235–1556)
Marinid dynasty (1269–1465)
Bahri dynasty (1250–1382)
Burji dynasty (1382–1517)
Wattasid dynasty (1472–1554)
Saadi dynasty (1554–1659)
Kingdom of Ait Abbas (1510–1872)
Alaouite dynasty (1666–present)
Husainid dynasty (1705–1957)
Karamanli dynasty (1711–1835)
Muhammad Ali dynasty (1805–1952)

Horn of Africa
Sultanate of Mogadishu (9th–13th centuries)
Sultanate of Showa (896–1286)
Ajuran Sultanate (13th–17th centuries)
Sultanate of Ifat (1285–1415)
Guled dynasty (1700s–1884)
Sugulleh dynasty (18th century-1884)
Adal Sultanate (c. 1415 – 1555)
Mudaito dynasty (16th century – present)
Sultanate of Harar (1526–1577)
Imamate of Aussa (1577–1672)
Emirate of Harar (1647–1887)
Sultanate of Geledi (late 17th–20th centuries)
Hiraab Imamate (late 17th–20th centuries)
Majeerteen Sultanate (mid-18th century – early 20th century)
Sultanate of Hobyo (mid-18th century – early 20th century)
Kingdom of Gomma (early 19th century – 1886)
Kingdom of Jimma (1830–1932)
Kingdom of Gumma (1840–1902)

Central and West Africa
Za dynasty in Gao (11th century–1275)
Sayfawa dynasty (1075–1846)
Mali Empire (c. 1230–c. 1600)
Keita dynasty (1235–c. 1670)
Songhai Empire (c. 1340–1591)
Bornu Empire (1396–1893)
Kingdom of Baguirmi (1522–1897)
Dendi Kingdom (1591–1901)
Sultanate of Damagaram (1731–1851)
Sokoto Caliphate (1804–1903) 
Toucouleur Empire (1836–1890)

African Great Lakes
Pate Sultanate (1203–1870)
Sennar (sultanate) (1523–1821)
Sultans on the Comoros
Wituland (1858–1923)

Europe

Eastern Europe and Russia
Volga Bulgaria (7th century–1240s)
Emirate of Crete (820s–961)
Avar Khanate (early 13th–19th century)
Golden Horde (1313–1502)
Khanate of Kazan (1438–1552)
Crimean Khanate (1441–1783)
Nogai Horde (1440s–1634)
Qasim Khanate (1452–1681)
Astrakhan Khanate (1466–1556)
Khanate of Sibir (1490–1598)
Pashalik of Scutari (1757–1831)
Pashalik of Berat (1774–1809)
Pashalik of Yanina (1788–1822)

Spain and Portugal
Caliphate of Córdoba (756–1017, 1023–1031)
Taifa of Alpuente (1009–1106)
Taifa of Badajoz (1009–1151)
Taifa of Morón (1010–1066)
Taifa of Toledo (1010–1085)
Taifa of Tortosa (1010–1099)
Taifa of Arcos (1011–1145)
Taifa of Almería (1010–1147)
Taifa of Denia (1010–1227)
Taifa of Valencia (1010–1238)
Taifa of Murcia (1011–1266)
Taifa of Albarracín (1012–1104)
Taifa of Zaragoza (1013–1110)
Taifa of Granada (1013–1145)
Taifa of Carmona (1013–1150)
Taifa of Santa María de Algarve (1018–1051)
Taifa of Mallorca (1018–1203)
Taifa of Lisbon (1022–1093)
Taifa of Seville (1023–1091)
Taifa of Niebla (1023–1262)
Taifa of Córdoba (1031–1091)
Taifa of Mértola (1033–1151)
Taifa of Algeciras (1035–1058)
Taifa of Ronda (1039–1065)
Taifa of Silves (1040–1151)
Taifa of Málaga (1073–1239)
Taifa of Molina (c. 1080's–1100)
Taifa of Lorca (1228–1250)
Taifa of Menorca (1228–1287)
Emirate of Granada (1228–1492)

Italy
Aghlabid Sicily (827–909)
Emirate of Bari (847–871)
Emirate of Taranto (840–880)

France
Fraxinetum

See also
List of Shia dynasties
List of Muslim states and dynasties

 
Sunni Muslim dynasties
Sunni Muslim dynasties
Lists of dynasties